Nicolas Marin (born 29 August 1980) is a French former professional footballer who played as a midfielder. He played for Auxerre, Saint-Étienne, Sedan, Lorient, Plymouth Argyle, SC Bastia, Sion, Lausanne-Sport, Dubai Club and Xanthi FC.

Career
Marin began his career with AJ Auxerre before establishing himself as a first-team regular at AS Saint-Étienne and then CS Sedan. Marin joined FC Lorient in 2007, but following a fallout with their manager Christian Gourcuff, Marin agreed to join English club Plymouth Argyle on a season-long loan with a view to a permanent move. But the loan was terminated through mutual consent at the beginning of January 2009. Marin is easily recognizable due to his bleached hair. After returning to Lorient, the club proceeded to terminate his contract. Later that day, Corsica-based side SC Bastia announced that they had signed him until the end of the season. On 11 August 2009, Marin joined FC Sion on free transfer. In July 2011, he signed a one-year contract with fellow Swiss club Lausanne-Sport. After scoring two goals in 13 league games for Lausanne, Marin was released from his contract in January 2012 in order to sign with UAE Pro-League side Dubai Club.

Marin retired in the summer 2017.

References

External links

1980 births
Living people
Footballers from Marseille
French footballers
Association football midfielders
French expatriate footballers
AJ Auxerre players
AS Saint-Étienne players
CS Sedan Ardennes players
FC Lorient players
Plymouth Argyle F.C. players
SC Bastia players
FC Sion players
FC Lausanne-Sport players
Dubai CSC players
Xanthi F.C. players
US Boulogne players
AS Magenta players
Ligue 1 players
Ligue 2 players
English Football League players
Swiss Super League players
Super League Greece players
UAE Pro League players
Expatriate footballers in England
Expatriate footballers in Switzerland
Expatriate footballers in Greece
French expatriate sportspeople in the United Arab Emirates